Pierre Bastou (born August 1, 1973 in La Ciotat) is a French professional football player. Currently, he plays in the Championnat de France amateur for ASF Andrézieux.

He played on the professional level in Ligue 1 and Ligue 2 for AS Saint-Étienne.

External links
 
 

1973 births
Living people
French footballers
Ligue 1 players
Ligue 2 players
AS Saint-Étienne players
Andrézieux-Bouthéon FC players
FC Aurillac Arpajon Cantal Auvergne players
People from La Ciotat
Association football midfielders
Sportspeople from Bouches-du-Rhône
Footballers from Provence-Alpes-Côte d'Azur